Allante may refer to:
 Allante (Arcadia), a town of ancient Arcadia
 Allante (Macedon), a city of ancient Macedon
 Cadillac Allanté, a car